Xavier de Maistre (born October 22, 1973) is a French harpist.

Life

Studies 

Maistre began studying the harp in his hometown conservatory in Toulon at the age of nine. Later he travelled to Paris to perfect his technique with Jacqueline Borot and Catherine Michel parallel to studying Political Sciences and Economics at the London School of Economics.

Career 

At the age of sixteen, Maistre won his first international competition in Paris, later winning awards at international competitions held in Cardiff, Munich, Vienna and Jerusalem. In 1998, he was awarded first prize and two interpretation prizes at the USA International Harp Competition.  Later that same year, Maistre became the first French musician to join the ranks of the prestigious Vienna Philharmonic Orchestra.

As a soloist, Maistre has appeared with numerous orchestras under the baton of such eminent conductors as Riccardo Muti, Daniele Gatti, Sir Simon Rattle, Sir André Prévin, Heinrich Schiff, Antoni Ros-Marbà, Bertrand de Billy, Walter Weller, Gilbert Varga, Josep Pons and Philippe Jordan, amongst others. He became the first harpist to appear as a soloist at one of the Vienna Philharmonic's subscription concerts In May 2002.

Maistre has also been invited to perform at many of Europe's leading festivals, including the Schleswig-Holstein, Salzburg, Rheingau, Vienna and Verbier Festivals, the Budapest Spring Festival and the Würzburg Mozart Festival. Among the musical artists he has performed with are Kathleen Battle, Ingolf Turban, Anne Gastinel, Diana Damrau and Barbara Bonney; he has as well performed with actors such as Peter Simonischek and Andrea Jonasson.

Among highlights of a tour with the Vienna Philharmonic Orchestra with the conductor Daniele Gatti in 2009, Maistre appeared as a soloist at the Amsterdam Concertgebouw, the Cologne Philharmonie and the Vienna Konzerthaus. He also appeared in concerts with the Orchestre National de France under Riccardo Muti at the Théâtre des Champs-Élysées; a series of recitals with Diana Damrau at the Festspielhaus in Baden-Baden, Paris Opera, La Scala, and the Musikhalle in Hamburg and recitals with Bo Skovhus at the Semperoper in Dresden, the Tonhalle in Düsseldorf and the Musikverein in Vienna.

As a teacher 

Maistre has taught at the Hamburg Academy of Music since 2001. He additionally gives regular masterclasses at New York's Juilliard School of Music, Tokyo's Toho University and London's Trinity College of Music.

Recent Albums

References

External links
Official Page

Musicians from Toulon
Living people
French classical harpists
1973 births